Jonathan F. Mitchell (born September 2, 1976) is an American attorney, academic, and former government official. From 2010 to 2015, he was the Solicitor General of Texas. He has argued five cases before the Supreme Court of the United States. He has served on the faculties of Stanford Law School, the University of Texas School of Law, the George Mason University School of Law, and the University of Chicago Law School. In 2018, he opened a private solo legal practice in Austin, Texas.

Mitchell is credited with devising the novel enforcement mechanism in the Texas Heartbeat Act, also known as Senate Bill 8 (or SB 8), which outlaws abortion after cardiac activity is detected and avoids judicial review by prohibiting government officials from enforcing the statute and empowering private citizens to bring lawsuits against those who violate it. On September 1, 2021, the Supreme Court of the United States refused to enjoin the enforcement of SB 8, marking the first time that a state had successfully imposed a pre-viability abortion ban since Roe v. Wade.

Education 
Mitchell graduated with high honors from the University of Chicago Law School in 2001. While in law school, Mitchell was an articles editor of the University of Chicago Law Review and a member of Order of the Coif.

Career 
After graduating from law school, Mitchell clerked for Judge J. Michael Luttig of the United States Court of Appeals for the Fourth Circuit and for Justice Antonin Scalia of the Supreme Court of the United States. After clerking, Mitchell served as an attorney-adviser in the office of legal counsel of the United States Department of Justice. 

After leaving the department of justice in 2006, Mitchell was a visiting assistant professor at the University of Chicago Law School from 2006 to 2008. He then served as an assistant professor of law at the George Mason University School of Law before his appointment as Solicitor General of Texas in 2010. After leaving the Texas Solicitor General office in 2015, Mitchell served on the faculty of the University of Texas School of Law, before joining the Hoover Institution as a visiting fellow from 2015 to 2016. Mitchell also served as a visiting professor of law at Stanford Law School before opening his own law firm in 2018. 

Mitchell has published scholarship on textualism, national-security law, criminal law and procedure, judicial review, and judicial federalism, and the legality of stare decisis in constitutional adjudication.

ACUS nomination 
In 2017, President Donald J. Trump nominated Mitchell to chair the Administrative Conference of the United States (ACUS). Mitchell’s nomination was voted out of committee, but never received a vote on the Senate floor.

Supreme Court practice 
Mitchell has argued five times before the Supreme Court of the United States and authored the principal merits brief in eight Supreme Court cases. Mitchell has also written amicus curiae briefs in the Supreme Court. In Dobbs v. Jackson Women's Health Organization, Mitchell and a colleague urged the Supreme Court to overrule Roe v. Wade, arguing that overturning Roe should eventually lead to the reversal of other "lawless" court decisions such as those establishing a right to same-sex marriage (Obergefell v. Hodges), while distinguishing and defending the right to interracial marriage recognized in Loving v. Virginia. 

Mitchell also submitted an amicus brief in Students for Fair Admissions v. President and Fellows of Harvard College, which urges the Supreme Court to declare race-based affirmative action unlawful under Title VI of the Civil Rights Act of 1964, without reaching the "much closer question" concerning the constitutionality of affirmative action under the Equal Protection Clause.

Senate Bill 8 
In 2021, the Texas legislature enacted the Texas Heartbeat Act or Senate Bill 8 (SB 8), which bans abortion at approximately six weeks of pregnancy and includes an unusual enforcement mechanism designed to insulate the law from judicial review. Rather than allowing state officials to enforce the ban, the statute authorizes private citizens to sue anyone who performs or assists a post-heartbeat abortion, while forbidding the state and its officers to enforce the law in any way. By designing the statute in this manner, the legislature sought to make it difficult for abortion providers to challenge SB 8 in pre-enforcement lawsuits.

On September 1, 2021, the Supreme Court of the United States refused to enjoin the enforcement of SB 8 on account of the “complex and novel antecedent procedural questions” presented by this enforcement mechanism. The courts eventually ruled that abortion providers could not challenge the constitutionality of SB 8 in pre-enforcement lawsuits; they must instead wait to be sued in state court by a private individual and assert their constitutional claims as a defense in those state-court proceedings. News outlets reported that Mitchell designed the enforcement mechanism that allowed SB 8 to evade judicial review and outlaw abortion in Texas despite the statute’s incompatibility with Roe v. Wade.

Efforts to stymie judicial review using SB 8 have been a matter of intense controversy. Supreme Court Justice Sonia Sotomayor denounced the statute as “a breathtaking act of defiance” that hinders the judiciary from counteracting a “flagrantly unconstitutional law”, while anti-abortion commentators have praised the statute for its novel design and its successful circumvention of Roe v. Wade. The success of SB 8 was a major blow to Roe v. Wade, as it enabled other states to ban abortion and evade judicial review by copying the novel enforcement mechanism of the statute.

Publications 
 The Writ-of-Erasure Fallacy, 104 Va. L. Rev. 934 (2018). 
 Textualism and the Fourteenth Amendment, 69 Stan. L. Rev. 1237 (2017). 
 Remembering the Boss, 84 U. Chi. L. Rev. 2291 (2017). 
 Commentary, Capital Punishment and the Courts, 120 Harv. L. Rev. Forum 269 (2017). 
 Judicial Review and the Future of Federalism, 49 Ariz. St. L. J. 1091 (2017). 
 Stare Decisis and Constitutional Text, 110 Mich. L. Rev. 1 (2011). 
 Reconsidering Murdock: State-Law Reversals as Constitutional Avoidance, 77 U. Chi. L. Rev. 1335 (2010). 
 Legislating Clear-Statement Regimes in National-Security Law, 43 Ga. L. Rev. 1059 (2009). 
 Apprendi’s Domain, 2006 Sup. Ct. Rev. 297.

See also 
List of law clerks of the Supreme Court of the United States (Seat 9)

References

External links 
 Biography at Stanford Law School
 Jonathan Mitchell on C-SPAN
 Appearances at the U.S. Supreme Court from the Oyez Project
 SSRN page for Jonathan F. Mitchell

Living people
1976 births
21st-century American lawyers
Federalist Society members
George Mason University School of Law faculty
Law clerks of J. Michael Luttig
Law clerks of the Supreme Court of the United States
Solicitors General of Texas
Stanford Law School faculty
Texas anti-abortion legislation
Trump administration personnel
University of Chicago Law School alumni
University of Chicago Law School faculty
University of Texas School of Law faculty